Silje Marie Vesterbekkmo (born 22 June 1983) is a Norwegian former footballer. She played as a goalkeeper for Røa IL and the Norway national team.

She played for IK Grand Bodø, Kolbotn, IF Fløya and Medkila IL before again joining Røa IL in 2013.

She was called up to be part of the national team for the UEFA Women's Euro 2013.

References

External links
 
 
 
 Silje Vesterbekkmo at Norwegian Football Federation 

1983 births
Living people
Norwegian women's footballers
Norway women's international footballers
Kolbotn Fotball players
Røa IL players
IF Fløya players
Medkila IL (women) players
Toppserien players
People from Vefsn
Women's association football goalkeepers
2015 FIFA Women's World Cup players
2003 FIFA Women's World Cup players
Norway women's youth international footballers
Sportspeople from Nordland